William Peters House is a historic home located in Pennsbury Township, Chester County, Pennsylvania. The original house was originally built in Aston Township, Delaware County, Pennsylvania and moved to its present site in 1965.  It was built in 1749–1750, and is a brick Georgian-style dwelling.

It was added to the National Register of Historic Places in 1971.

References

Houses on the National Register of Historic Places in Pennsylvania
Georgian architecture in Pennsylvania
Houses completed in 1750
Houses in Chester County, Pennsylvania
National Register of Historic Places in Chester County, Pennsylvania